Joel Michael Reynolds (born 1985) is an American philosopher whose research focuses on disability. His areas of specialization include Philosophy of Disability, Bioethics, Continental Philosophy, and Social Epistemology. He is an Assistant Professor of Philosophy and Disability Studies in the Department of Philosophy at Georgetown University, a Senior Research Scholar at the Kennedy Institute of Ethics, a senior bioethics advisor to The Hastings Center, and core faculty in Georgetown's Disability Studies Program. In 2022, he was named a Faculty Scholar of The Greenwall Foundation (class of 2025) in support of his project “Addressing the Roots of Disability Health Disparities." He is the founder of the Journal of Philosophy of Disability, which he edits with Teresa Blankmeyer Burke, and co-founder of Oxford Studies in Disability, Ethics, & Society, a book series from Oxford University Press which he edits with Rosemarie Garland-Thomson.

Reynolds is the author of a number of books, including The Life Worth Living: Disability, Pain, and Morality (University of Minnesota Press, May 2022), The Meaning of Disability (Oxford University Press, under contract), and Philosophy of Disability: An Introduction (Polity, under contract). He is also the co-editor of The Disability Bioethics Reader (Routledge, May 2022) with Christine Wieseler, The Art of Flourishing: Conversations on Disability (Oxford University Press, under contract) with Erik Parens, Liz Bowen, and Rosemarie Garland-Thomson, and of a 2020 special issue of The Hastings Center Report, “For All of Us? On the Weight of Genomic Knowledge,” also with Erik Parens.

He earned his B.A. in Philosophy as well as Religious Studies from the Robert D. Clark Honors College at the University of Oregon and his M.A. and Ph.D. from Emory University. He has received fellowships supported by the National Endowment for the Humanities, the Andrew W. Mellon Foundation, and the Howard Hughes Medical Institute. Reynolds previously taught at The University of Massachusetts Lowell; he held the inaugural Rice Family Postdoctoral Fellowship in Bioethics and the Humanities at The Hastings Center from 2017 to 2020; and he held the inaugural Laney Graduate School Disability Studies Fellowship at Emory University from 2014 to 2015. At the University of Oregon, Reynolds won the George Rebec Prize for best essay by a philosophy student in 2007, 2008, and 2009. Also in 2009, he won the President's Award from the Robert D. Clark Honor's College for Distinguished Thesis.

References 

1985 births
Living people